Shurtan and its variant Şurtan may refer to:

Shurtan
Shurtan gas field, a natural gas field and natural gas condensate in Uzbekistan
Shurtan (river), a river in Perm Krai and Sverdlovsk Oblast, Russia, a tributary of the Irgina
FC Shurtan Guzar, an Uzbek football club
Shurtan Stadium, also known as Sho'rtan Stadion, the official home of FC Shurtan Guzar

Şurtan
Şurtan (also, Shurtan), a village in the Kalbajar Rayon of Azerbaijan
Aşağı Şurtan, (also, Ashagy Shurtan), a village in the Kalbajar Rayon of Azerbaijan.
Yuxarı Şurtan (also, Yukhary Shurtan), a village in the Kalbajar Rayon of Azerbaijan

See also
Al-Shorta (disambiguation)
Shurta